Sorkhabad, also rendered as Surkhabad, may refer to:
 Sorkhabad, Fars
 Sorkhabad, Hamadan
 Sorkhabad, Mazandaran
 Sorkhabad, Razavi Khorasan
 Sorkhabad, Zanjan